Jean de Corbeil (died November 1318), Seigneur of Grez-sur-Loing, was a Marshal of France.

He was the son of Jean de Corbeil, lord of Grez-sur-Loing, and grandson of Bishop Guillaume de Grez, count of Beauvais and a Peer of France. In 1308 de Corbeil was appointed Marshal of France by Philip IV and was sent to Flanders. In May 1313 he was among the lords appointed by Louis X to negotiate peace with Louis I, Count of Nevers. He served in Flanders in 1318 under Louis, Count of Évreux and died at the end of that year.

References

Marshals of France
Medieval French nobility
Lords of France
13th-century births
Year of birth unknown
1318 deaths
13th-century French people
14th-century French people
14th-century military history of France